This is a list of the founding members of the Society of the Cincinnati.

United States

Connecticut 

Abraham Baldwin, Joel Barlow, Zebulon Butler, Henry Champion, John Chester, Jonathan Hart, David Humphreys, Ebenezer Huntington, Jedediah Huntington, Jacob Kingsbury, John Mansfield, Joseph Spencer, Heman Swift, Benjamin Tallmadge, Jonathan Trumbull, Jr., John Wyllys, Palgrave Wyllys, Amos Walbridge (major), Samuel B. Webb, Jeremiah West (Surgeon)

Delaware 

Daniel Jenifer Adams, Enoch Anderson, Joseph Anderson, Thomas Anderson, William Anderson, Caleb Prew Bennett, James Campbell, John Driskill, Henry Duff, Reuben Gilder, David Hall, Joseph Hossman, John Vance Hyatt, Peter Jacquett, Jr., James Jones, Charles Kidd, David Kirkpatrick, Robert Henry Kirkwood, Henry Latimer, John Learmonth, William McKennan, Allen (Allan) McLane, Stephen McWilliam, Nathaniel Mitchell, George Monro, James Moore, John Patten, John Platt, Charles Pope, George Purvis, Edward Roche, Ebenezer Augustus Smith, James Tilton, Nathaniel Twinning, Joseph Vaughan, William Adams (son of Nathan Adams), and Joseph Haslet (son of John Haslet).

Georgia 

James Armstrong, Samuel Elbert, George Mathews, John Milton, Francis Tennille.

Maryland 

Lloyd Beall, Joshua Burgess, John H. Stone, Samuel Smith, William Lynch Lamar, Josias Carvel Hall, John Eager Howard, Mordecai Gist, James Craik, John Gunby, James Peale, Moses Rawlings, Thomas Lancaster Lansdale, James Lingan, Levin Winder, Nathaniel Ramsey, William Smallwood, Tench Tilghman, Otho Holland Williams, Richard Pindell (surgeon), Joshua Barney, Thomas Hussey Luckett.

Further list from Saffell:

John Eccleston, John Nicholson, Henry Hardman, John Davidson, William D. Beall, William Brown, John Cotes, Richard Dorsey, David Morrow, Ezekiel Hayne, Thomas Boyd, Samuel Morrow, James Armstrong, Thomas Mason, Samuel McPherson, Henry Baldwin, James Bracco, John Hamilton, William Campbell, George Hamilton, John L. Elbert, Nicholas Ricketts, David Hopkins, Basil Burgess, Thomas Price, James Smith, Jonathan Morris, Edward Hall, Isaac Rawlings, Edward OJdham, William Reily, John Kilty, John Jordan, Perry Benson, Michael Boyer, John J. Jacobs, Edward Dyer, Philip Reed, Samuel Hanson, Arthur Harris, Samuel B. Beall, Edward Spurrier, John Brevitt, William Pendergast, Thomas Rouse, William Kilty, Francis Revelly, Thomas Bealty, Mark McPherson, Henry Gaither, John Sears, Christopher Richmond, Edward Compton, Samuel F. Keene, John Sprigg Belt, John Hughes, Benjamin Price, James Bruff, William Bruce, Elisha Harrison, Adamson Tannehill, John D. Carey, James Mann, John Gassaway, Thomas A. Dyson, Henry Clements, Samuel Edrniston, John T. Lowe, William Smoote, Elihu Hall, Malachi Bonham, Hezekiah Ford, Gerard Wood, Henry H. Chapman, Isaac Hanson, Benjamin Fickle, Richard Anderson, John Smith, James W. Gray, John Mitchell, Nathan Wright, William Goldsborough, Walter Muse, James Baques, Clement Skerrett, Henry Gassaway, Bobert Gerry, Edward Pratt, Horatio Clagett, John Swan, Rezin Davis, James McFadon, Mountjoy Bailey, Paul Bentalou, John Carlisle, Archibald McAllister, John Gale, Eichard Waters, George Handy, John Trueman, Gassaway Watkins, Joseph Smith, Levin Denwood, Alexander Trueman, Joseph Cross, John Smith, James Somerville, Ebenezer Denny, James G. Heron, Daniel Jenifer, Richard Pindell, Jonathan Sellman, Walter Warfield, Thomas Woolford, Benjamin Brooks, Lilburn W. Williams, James Ewing, Eichard Chiderson, James Winchester, Samuel T. Wright, George Winchester, David Luckett, Osborn Williams, John Lynn, Joshua Rutledge, Philip Hill, Peregrine Fitzhugh, John Lynch.

Massachusetts 

Stephen Abbot, Jeduthan Baldwin, John Brooks, Henry Burbeck, David Cobb, John Crane, Thomas Humphrey Cushing, William Eustis, Constant Freeman, John Greaton, Africa Hamlin, William Heath, William Hull, Thomas Hunt, Henry Knox, Henry Jackson, Michael Jackson, Simon Larned, Benjamin Lincoln, Samuel Nicholson, William North, Alexander Oliver, Rufus Putnam, William Shepard, William Stacy, Benjamin Tupper, Elisha Horton, Abraham Williams, John Yeomans, Dr. Abijah Richardson.

OM	Abbot, Josiah, Ens.	2nd Reg. MCL
OM	Abbot, Stephen, Capt.	8th Reg. MCL
OM	Adams, Henry, Surg. [S]	6th Reg, MCL
OM	Adams, Henry, Surgeon	6th Reg. MCL
OM	Alden, Judah, Capt.	2nd Reg. MCL
OM	Allen, Nathaniel Coit, Capt.	4th Reg. MCL
OM	Allen, Noah, Maj.	1st Reg. MCL
OM	Allen, Noah, Maj. [S]	1st Reg. MCL
OM	Ames, Jotham, 1st Lt.	2nd Reg. MCL
OM	Andrews, William, 1st Lt.  *	3rd Reg. Cont. Artillery
OM	Armstrong, Samuel, 2nd Lt.*	3rd Reg. MCL
OM	Ashley, Moses, Maj.	6th Reg. MCL
OM	Austin, John, 2nd Lt.	3rd Reg. Cont. Artillery
OM	Bailey, Adams, Capt. 	2nd Reg. MCL
OM	Bailey, Luther, Capt. 	2nd Reg. MCL
OM	Balcom, Joseph, Lt.	6th Reg. MCL
OM	Baldwin, Jeduthan, Col. 	Corps of Engineers
OM	Ballantine, Ebenezer, Surg. Mate	6th Reg. MCL
OM	Ballard, William Hudson, Maj.          	15th Reg. MCL
OM	Bancroft, James, Lt. (son of James) 	8th Reg. MCL
OM	Barlow, Joel Chap.	Massachusetts Cont. Brigade (end of war)
OM	Bassett, Barachiah, Lt. Col.	14th Reg. MCL
OM	Bates, Joseph, Capt.	7th Reg. MCL
OM	Baury de Bellerive, Louis, Capt. 	Chausseurs de San Domingo, French
OM	Baylies, Hodijah, Maj.	Aide-de-Camp to General Washington
OM	Benson, Joshua, Jr., Capt.	5th Reg. MCL
OM	Blake, Edward, Jr., 2nd Lt.	3rd Reg. Cont. Artillery
OM	Blanchard, John, Capt.	4th Reg. MCL
OM	Blodget, Caleb, Lt.	1st Reg. New Hampshire Cont. Line
OM	Bowles, Ralph Hart, 1st Lt. 	Jackson's Additional Continenatl Reg.
OM	Bowman, Samuel, Lt. 	1st Reg. MCL
OM	Bradford, Andrew, Lt.	7th Reg. MCL
OM	Bradford, Gamaliel, Col. 	14th Reg. MCL
OM	Bradford, Gamaliel, Jr., Lt.	Jackson's Additional Cont. Reg.
OM	Bradford, Robert, Capt. 	2nd Reg. MCL
OM	Bramhall, Joshua, 1st Lt.	3rd Reg. MCL
OM	Brigham, Origin, Surg. Mate	2nd Reg. MCL
OM	Brooks, John, Lt. Col. 	7th Reg. MCL
OM	Brown, Ebenezer, Lt.	1st Reg. MCL
OM	Brown, Oliver, Capt. Lt.	3rd Reg. Cont. Artillery
OM	Bugbee, Edward, Lt.	2nd Canadian Cont. Reg.
OM	Bullard, Asa, Lt.	2nd Reg. MCL
OM	Burbeck, Henry, Capt.	3rd Reg. Cont. Artillery
OM	Burnam, John, Maj.	5th Reg. MCL
OM	Bussey, Isaiah, Capt. Lt. 	3rd Reg. Cont. Artillery
OM	Callender, John, Capt. Lt.	3rd Reg. Cont. Artillery
OM	Carleton, Moses, Lt.	5th Reg. MCL
OM	Carleton, Osgood, 1st Lt.	Corps of Invalids – Quartermaster
OM	Castaing, Peter la Grace, (Pierre) 1st Lt.	Aide-de-Camp to Gen. Duportail (Fr.)
OM	Chambers, Matthew, Capt.	6th Reg. MCL
OM	Chapin, Samuel, 1st Lt.	4th Reg. MCL
OM	Clap, Caleb, Capt. 	4th Reg. MCL
OM	Clap, Joshua, Lt.	3rd Reg. MCL
OM	Clayes, Peter, Capt. 	6th Reg. MCL
OM	Cobb, David, Lt. Col.	5th Reg. MCL
OM	Cogswell, Amos, Capt.	3rd Reg. MCL
OM	Cogswell, Samuel, 1st Lt.	4th Reg. MCL
OM	Cogswell, Thomas, Lt. Col.	15th Reg. MCL
OM	Condy, Thomas Hollis, 1st Lt.	4th Reg. MCL
OM	Cook, David, Capt.	3rd Reg. Cont. Artillery
OM	Cooper, Ezekiel, Capt.	2nd Reg. MCL
OM	Cooper, Samuel, 2nd Lt. 	3rd Reg. Cont. Artillery
OM	Crane, John, Col. 	3rd Reg. Cont. Artillery
OM	Crane, John, Surgeon	6th Reg. MCL
OM	Crocker, Joseph, Capt.	3rd Reg. MCL
OM	Crowley, Florence, 1st Lt.	3rd Reg. Cont. Artillery
OM	Cushing, Nathaniel, Brig., Maj.	1st Reg MCL
OM	Cushing, Thomas Humphrey, 1st Lt.	1st Reg. MCL
OM	Dana, Benjamin, 1st Lt. 	13th Reg. MCL
OM	Danforth, Joshua, Lt.	2nd Reg. MCL
OM	Daniels, Japheth, Capt.	6th Reg. MCL
OM	Darby, Samuel, Maj.	8th Reg. MCL
OM	Davis, Ebenezer, Lt.	3rd Reg. MCL
OM	Davis, James, 2nd Lt.	3rd Reg. MCL
OM	Davis, John, Lt.	4th Reg. MCL
OM	Dean, Walter, Capt. 	10th Reg. MCL
OM	Dix, Nathan, Capt.	3rd Reg. MCL	
OM	Dodge, Levi, 2nd Lt.	1st Reg. MCL
OM	Dolliver, Peter, Capt.	Jackson's Additional Cont. Reg.
OM	Donnell, Nathaniel, Capt.	3rd Reg. Cont. Artillery
OM	Drew, Seth, Maj. App Out 	3rd Reg. MCL
OM	Duffield, John, Surgeon	3rd Reg. Cont. Artillery
OM	Eaton, Benjamin, 2nd Lt.	3rd Reg. Cont. Artillery
OM	Edwards, Thomas, Lt. 	2nd Reg. MCL
OM	Egleston, Azariah, Lt.	1st Reg. MCL
OM	Emerson, Nehemiah, Capt. [S]	10th Reg. MCL
OM	Emery, Ephraim, Lt.	6th Reg. MCL
OM	Eustis, William, Hosp. Surgeon	Hospital Dept.
OM	Everett, Pelatiah, 1st Lt.	1st Reg. MCL
OM	Eysandeau, William [Guillaume], Lt.	3rd Reg. MCL [Fr?]
OM	Felt, Jonathan, Capt. *	7th Reg. MCL
OM	Fernald, Tobias, Lt. Col.          	10th Reg. MCL
OM	Finley, James Edward Burr, Surgeon	4th Reg. MCL
OM	Finley, Samuel, Jr., Surgeon	7th Reg. MCL
OM	Fisk, Joseph, Surgeon 	1st Reg. MCL
OM	Floyd, Ebenezer, Ens.	1st Reg. MCL
OM	Foster, Elisha, Ens.	2nd Reg. MCL
OM	Foster, Thomas, Lt. 	8th Reg. MCL
OM	Fowle, John, Capt.	3rd Reg. MCL
OM	Freeman, Constant, Capt. Lt.	3rd Reg. Cont. Artillery
OM	Freeman, Thomas Davis, Lt.	7th Reg. MCL
OM	Frink, Samuel, Ens.	4th Reg. MCL
OM	Frost, Samuel, Capt.	6th Reg. MCL
OM	Frothingham, Benjamin, Capt.	3rd Reg. Cont. Artillery
OM	Frye, Frederick, Ens.	1st Reg. MCL
OM	Fuller, John, Capt. 	4th Reg. MCL
OM	Gardner, James, Capt. Lt.	3rd Reg. Cont. Artillery
OM	Garret, Andrew, Lt.	6th Reg. MCL
OM	George, John, Capt. Lt.	3rd Reg. Cont. Artillery
OM	Gibbs, Caleb, Maj.	2nd Reg. MCL
OM	Gilbert, Benjamin, Lt.	3rd Reg. MCL
OM	Goodale, Nathan, Capt.	1st Reg. MCL
OM	Goodwin, Francis LeBaron, Surg. Mate	3rd Reg. MCL
OM	Greaton, John, Brig. Gen.	Cont. Army
OM	Greaton, John Wheelwright, Ens.         	3rd Reg. MCL
OM	Greaton, Richard Humphrey, Ens.	3rd Reg. MCL
OM	Green, Francis, Capt.	1st Reg. MCL
OM	Greenleaf, William, 1st Lt.	8th Reg. MCL
OM	Gridley, John, Capt. Lt. 	3rd Reg. Cont. Artillery
OM	Hall, James, Capt. Lt.	3rd Reg. Cont. Artillery
OM	Hamlin, Africa, Ens. 	4th Reg. MCL
OM	Hancock, Belcher, Capt.	1st Reg. MCL
OM	Hart, John, Surgeon	2nd Reg. MCL
OM	Hartshorn, Thomas, Capt.	8th Reg. MCL
OM	Harvey, Elisha, Capt. Lt.	2nd Reg. Cont. Artillery
OM	Haskell, Elnathan, Brev. Maj.	Jackson's Additional Cont. Reg.
OM	Haskell, Jonathan, Lt.	2nd Reg. MCL
OM	Hastings, John, Capt.	7th Reg. MCL
OM	Heath, William, Maj. Gen.	Cont. Army
OM	Heywood, Benjamin, Capt. (Heyward)  	6th Reg. MCL
OM	Hildreth, William, Lt.	8th Reg. MCL
OM	Hill, Jeremiah, 1st Lt.	2nd Reg. MCL
OM	Hinds, Bartlett, Capt.	10th Reg. MCL
OM	Hiwell, John, 1st Lt.	3rd Reg. Cont. Artillery
OM	Hobby, John, Capt.	3rd Reg. MCL
OM	Holbrook, David, Capt. 	4th Reg. MCL
OM	Holden, Aaron, 1st Lt.	7th Reg. MCL
OM	Holden, Abel, Capt.	6th Reg. MCL
OM	Holden, John, Jr., 1st Lt.	2nd Reg. MCL
OM	Holden, Levi, 1st Lt. 	6th Reg. MCL
OM	Holland, Ivory, 1st Lt. 	5th Reg. MCL
OM	Holland, Park, Lt. 	5th Reg. MCL
OM	Hollister, Jesse, Capt.	4th Reg. MCL
OM	Homans, John, Surg. 	2nd Reg. Cont. Dragoons
OM	Homans, John, Surg. [S] 	2nd Reg. Cont. Dragoons
OM	Hooker, Zibeon, 1st Lt.	5th Reg. MCL
OM	Horton, Elisha, Ens.	12th Reg. MCL
OM	Houdin, Michael Gabriel, Capt.	2nd Reg. MCL
OM	Howe, Richard Surcomb, Ens.	4th Reg. MCL
OM	Hull, William, Lt. Col. 	3rd Reg. MCL
OM	Hunt, Abraham, Capt.	1st Reg. MCL
OM	Hunt, Ephraim, 1st Lt.	4th Reg. MCL
OM	Hunt, Thomas, Capt. 	3rd Reg. MCL
OM	Hurd, John, Jr., Ens.	2nd Reg. MCL
OM	Ingersoll, George, 1st Lt.	3rd Reg. Cont. Artillery
OM	Jackson, Amasa, Ens. 	3rd Reg. MCL
OM	Jackson, Charles, Ens.	3rd Reg. MCL
OM	Jackson, Daniel, 1st Lt. 	3rd Reg. Cont. Artillery
OM	Jackson, Ebenezer, 2nd Lt.	3rd Reg. Cont. Artillery
OM	Jackson, Henry, Col.	4th Reg. MCL
OM	Jackson, Michael Brevet Maj. Gen. 	3rd Reg. MCL
OM	Jackson, Michael, 2nd Lt.	3rd Reg. MCL
OM	Jackson, Simon, Capt. Lt.	2nd Reg. MCL
OM	Jackson, Thomas, Capt.	3rd Reg. Cont. Artillery
OM	Jefferds, Samuel, 1st Lt.	3rd Reg. Cont. Artillery
OM	Johnston, John, Capt. Lt.	Knox's Artillery
OM	Killam, Joseph, Capt.	1st Reg. MCL
OM	King, Zebulon, Capt.	4th Reg. MCL
OM	Knapp, Moses, Maj.	5th Reg. MCL
OM	Knowles, Charles, Capt., Lt.	3rd Reg. Cont. Artillery
OM	Knox, Henry, Maj. Gen	Cont. Army
OM	Larned, Simon, Capt.	Aide-de-Camp to General Glover
OM	Laughton, William (Lawton),Surg. Mate	5th Reg. MCL
OM	Leavenworth, Nathaniel, Surg. Mate	2nd Reg. MCL
OM	Lee, Daniel, Capt.	3rd Reg. MCL
OM	Lee, William Raymond, Col.	Lee's Additional Cont. Reg.
OM	Leland, Joseph, 1st Lt. *	8th Reg. MCL
OM	Leonard, Jacob, Ens.	2nd Reg. MCL
OM	Leverett, William, Lt.	Jackson's Additional Cont. Reg.
OM	Lillie, John, Brev. Maj. 	Aide-de-Camp to General Knox
OM	Lincoln, Benjamin, Maj. Gen.	Cont. Army
OM	Lincoln, Rufus, Capt. 	7th Reg. MCL
OM	Liswell, John, 2nd Lt.	3rd Reg. Cont. Artillery
OM	Lithgow, William, Maj. 	11th Reg. MCL
OM	Lockwood, William, Brig. Chap.	1st Massachusetts Cont. Brigade
OM	Lord, Jeremiah, Ens.	2nd Reg. MCL
OM	Lovell, James, Ens.	Lee's Battalion of Light Dragoons
OM	Lunt, Daniel, Capt. 	1st Reg. MCL
OM	Lyman, Cornelius, Ens.	2nd Reg. MCL
OM	Marble, Henry, 2nd Lt.	5th Reg. MCL
OM	Mason, David, Jr., Lt.	3rd Reg. Cont. Artillery
OM	Maxwell, Hugh, Lt. Col. 	3rd Reg. MCL
OM	Maynard, John, Lt.	3rd Reg. MCL
OM	Maynard, Jonathan, Capt.	7th Reg. MCL
OM	Maynard, William, Lt.	Corps of Invalids – wounded at Bunker Hill
OM	McCay [M’Cay], Daniel, Ens.	1st Reg. MCL
OM	McKendry, William, 2nd Lt.	4th Reg. MCL
OM	Means, James, Capt.	2nd Reg. MCL
OM	Mellish, Samuel, 1st Lt.	3rd Reg. MCL
OM	Miller, Jeremiah, Capt.	1st Reg. MCL
OM	Miller, Joseph, 2nd Lt.	6th Reg. MCL
OM	Mills, John, Capt.	1st Reg. MCL
OM	Mills, William, Capt.	4th Reg. MCL
OM	Mooers, Benjamin, Lt.	2nd Canadian Cont. Reg.
OM	Moor, William, 1st Lt.	3rd Reg. Cont. Artillery
OM	Moore, William, Capt. 	4th Reg. MCL
OM	Morgan, Benjamin, Surg. Mate	1st Reg. MCL
OM	Morrill, Amos, Maj.	Reid's New Hampshire Cont. Battalion
OM	Morton, Silas, 1st Lt.	2nd Reg. MCL
OM	Myrick, Samuel, 2nd Lt. *	2nd Reg. MCL
OM	Nason, Nathaniel, 1st Lt.	1st Reg. MCL
OM	Nelson, Henry, Lt. 	3rd Reg. MCL
OM	Newhall, Ezra, Lt. Col. 	4th Reg. MCL
OM	Newman, Samuel, Lt.	Cont. Navy
OM	Nicholson, Samuel, Capt. 	Cont. Navy
OM	Nixon, Thomas, Col.	6th Reg. MCL
OM	North, William, Capt.	Aide-de-Camp to General Steuben
OM	Oliver, Alexander, Ens.	5th Reg. MCL
OM	Robert Oliver, Maj. 2nd Reg. MCL
OM	Pardee, Aaron, 2nd Lt.	3rd Reg. Cont. Artillery
OM	Parker, Benjamin, 1st Lt.	9th Reg. MCL
OM	Parker, Elias J., 1st Lt.	1st Reg. MCL
OM	Paterson, John Brig. Gen.	Cont. Army
OM	Peabody, Ebenezer, 1st Lt.	7th Reg. MCL
OM	Peirce, John, Capt.	3rd Reg. Cont. Artillery
OM	Peirce, Silas, Capt.	8th Reg. MCL
OM	Perkins, William, Maj.	3rd Reg. Cont. Artillery
OM	Peters, Andrew, Lt. Col.	15th Reg. MCL
OM	Pettengill, Joseph, Maj.	1st Reg. MCL
OM	Phelon, Edward, Lt.	Aide-de-Camp to General Rufus Putnam
OM	Phelon, John, 1st Lt. 	3rd Reg. MCL
OM	Phelon, Patrick, 1st Lt.	3rd Reg. MCL
OM	Pickering, Timothy, Col. *	Quartermaster General, Cont. Army
OM	Pierce, Benjamin, Lt.	1st Reg. MCL
OM	Pike, Benjamin, Capt.	6th Reg. MCL
OM	Pope, Isaac, Maj.	3rd Reg. MCL
OM	Popkin, John, Lt. Col.	3rd Reg. Cont. Artillery
OM	Porter, Benjamin Jones, Surg. Mate	4th Reg. MCL
OM	Pratt, Joel, Lt. *	4th Reg. MCL
OM	Pray, John, Capt.	1st Reg. MCL
OM	Prescott, Joseph, Surg. Mate	Hospital Dept.
OM	Price, William, 1st Lt.	3rd Reg. Cont. Artillery
OM	Putnam, Rufus, Brig. Gen.	Cont. Army
OM	Randall, Thomas, Capt.	3rd Reg. Cont. Artillery
OM	Rawson, Jeduthan, Ens.	2nd Reg. MCL
OM	Reab, George, Lt.	4th Reg. MCL
OM	Remich, Timothy, Maj.	1st Reg. MCL – Brigade Major
OM	Remich, Timothy, Maj. [S] 	1st Reg. MCL – Brigade Major
OM	Rice, Nathan, Maj.	4th Reg. MCL
OM	Rice, Oliver, Lt.	4th Reg. MCL
OM	Richardson, Abijah, Surg.	5th Reg. MCL
OM	Rickard, William, Lt.	4th Reg. MCL
OM	Ripley, Hezekiah, 1st Lt.	2nd Reg. MCL
OM	Roberts, Richard Brooke, Capt.	Aide-de-Camp to General Lincoln
OM	Rouse, Oliver, Capt. [Brevet]	12th Reg. MCL
OM	Rowe, John, Ens.	8th Reg. MCL
OM	Sampson, Crocker, 1st Lt. 	7th Reg. MCL
OM	Sargent, Winthrop, Capt.	Aide-de-Camp to General Howe
OM	Satterlee, William, Capt.	2nd Canadian Cont. Reg.
OM	Savage, Henry, 1st Lt.	Aide-de-Camp to General Nixon
OM	Savage, Joseph, Capt. 	2nd Reg. Cont. Artillery
OM	Sawyer, James, Ens. 	8th Reg. MCL
OM	Scammell, Samuel Leslie, Ens.	2nd Reg. MCL
OM	Scott, James Miles, Ens.	4th Reg. MCL
OM	Selden, Charles, 1st Lt.	9th Reg. MCL
OM	Sever, James, Ens.	7th Reg. MCL
OM	Sewall, Henry, Capt.	2nd Reg. MCL
OM	Seward, Thomas, Capt.	3rd Reg. Cont. Artillery
OM	Shaw, Samuel, Capt.	Aide-de-Camp to General Knox
OM	Shepard, William Jr., Ens. *	4th Reg. MCL
OM	Shepard, William, Col. App Out	4th Reg. MCL
OM	Shute, Daniel, Surg.	4th Reg. MCL
OM	Smith, Ebenezer, Capt.   	8th Reg. MCL  [d. 1824]
OM	Smith, Ebenezer, Capt. 	2nd Reg. MCL  [d. 1816]
OM	Smith, John Kilby, Capt.	6th Reg. MCL
OM	Smith, Joseph, 1st Lt.	5th Reg. MCL
OM	Smith, Josiah, Lt.	6th Reg. MCL
OM	Smith, Silvanus, Capt. 	5th Reg. MCL
OM	Smith, Simeon, Capt.	Warner's Additional Cont. Reg.
OM	Spring, Simeon, 1st Lt.	4th Reg. MCL
OM	Sprout, Ebenezer, Lt. Col. 	2nd Reg. MCL
OM	Stacy, William, Lt. Col.	4th Reg. MCL
OM	Stafford, John Roosevelt, Ens.         	3rd Reg. MCL
OM	Stevens, William, Capt.	Cont. Artillery
OM	Stocker, Ebenezer, 2nd Lt.	3rd Reg. MCL
OM	Stone, Jonathan, Capt.	5th Reg. MCL
OM	Stone, Nathaniel, 1st Lt.	1st Reg. MCL
OM	Storer, Ebenezer, Lt.	2nd Reg. MCL
OM	Storey, William, Capt.	8th Reg. MCL
OM	Story, John, Lt. Col.	Aide-de-Camp to General Alexander
OM	Sumner, Job, Maj. (John) 	3rd Reg. MCL
OM	Swan, Caleb, Ens.	8th Reg, MCL
OM	Taylor, Jr., Othniel, Capt. 	10th Reg. MCL
OM	Taylor, Tertius, 2nd Lt.	1st Reg. MCL
OM	Taylor, William, 1st Lt.	2nd Reg. MCL
OM	Thacher, James, Surg. 	9th Reg. MCL
OM	Thacher, Nathaniel, Lt.	5th Reg. MCL
OM	Thomas, John, Surgeon 	3rd Reg. MCL
OM	Thomas, Joseph, Capt.	2nd Reg. Cont. Artillery
OM	Thompson, Thaddeus, Surg.	6th Reg. MCL
OM	Tisdale, James, Capt. *	3rd Reg. MCL
OM	Torrey, William, 1st Lt.	2nd Reg. MCL  [d. 1828]
OM	Torrey, William, 2nd Lt. 	2nd Canadian (Hazen's) Reg. [1831]
OM	Town, Jacob, Lt.	2nd Reg. MCL
OM	Townsend, David, Surg. General	Hospital Dept.
OM	Treadwell, William, Capt.	3rd Reg. Cont. Artillery
OM	Trescott, Lemuel, Maj.	7th Reg. MCL
OM	Trotter, John, Capt.	Aide-de-Camp to General Rufus Putnam
OM	Trowbridge, Luther, 1st Lt.	7th Reg. MCL
OM	Tucker, Joseph, Lt.	7th Reg. MCL
OM	Tucker, Samuel, Capt. 	Cont. Navy
OM	Tudor, William, Lt. Col. 	Judge Advocate General, Cont. Army
OM	Tupper, Anselm, Lt.	6th Reg. MCL
OM	Tupper, Benjamin, Col.	6th Reg. MCL
OM	Turner, Jonathan, Capt.	5th Reg. MCL
OM	Turner, Marlbry, Lt.	2nd Reg. MCL
OM	Turner, Peleg, 2nd Lt.	10th Reg. MCL
OM	Turner, Thomas, Capt. 	7th Reg. MCL
OM	Vose, Elijah, Lt. Col.	1st Reg. MCL
OM	Vose, Joseph, Col. [Brev. Brig. Gen.]  	1st Reg. MCL
OM	Vose, Thomas, Capt.	3rd Reg. Cont. Artillery
OM	Wales, Joseph, Lt.	6th Reg. MCL
OM	Walker, Edward, Lt.	4th Reg. MCL
OM	Walker, Robert, Capt. 	2nd Reg. MCL
OM	Wardwell, Joseph, Ens.	1st Reg. MCL
OM	Warren, Adriel, 1st Lt.	1st Reg. MCL
OM	Warren, James, Jr., Lt. 	Cont. Navy
OM	Warren, John, Lt.	5th Reg. MCL
OM	Watson, William, Capt.	3rd Reg. MCL
OM	Wattles, Mason, Capt.	6th Reg. MCL
OM	Webb, George, Capt.	4th Reg. MCL
OM	Webber, Daniel, Lt.	2nd Reg. MCL
OM	Wellington, Elisha, 2nd Lt.	7th Reg. MCL
OM	Wells, Benjamin, Lt.	1st Reg. MCL
OM	Wells, James A., Lt.	4th Reg. MCL
OM	Wells, Thomas, Capt. 	3rd Reg. Cont. Artillery
OM	Wesson, James, Col.	9th Reg. MCL
OM	White, Edward, 2nd Lt.	3rd Reg. MCL
OM	White, Haffield, Capt. 	5th Reg. MCL
OM	Whiting, John, Lt.	2nd Reg. MCL
OM	Whitwell, Samuel, Surg.	3rd Reg. MCL
OM	Wigglesworth, Edward, Col.	13th Reg. MCL
OM	Wild, Ebenezer, 2nd Lt.	1st Reg. MCL
OM	Williams, Abraham, Capt. 	2nd Reg. MCL
OM	Williams, Ebenezer, 1st Lt.	1st Reg. MCL
OM	Williams, John, Capt.	1st Reg. MCL
OM	Williams, Joseph, Capt.	3rd Reg. MCL
OM	Williams, Robert, 1st Lt.	4th Reg. MCL
OM	Wing, Jonathan, Ens.	1st Reg. MCL
OM	Winslow, John, Capt.	3rd Reg. Cont. Artillery
OM	Woodbridge, Christopher, Capt.	3rd Reg. MCL
OM	Woodward, Samuel, Surg. Mate	3rd Reg. Cont. Artillery
OM	Yeomans, John, 1st Lt.	4th Reg. MCL

New Hampshire 

John Adams, Samuel Adams, Joseph Boynton, Jonathan Cass, Samuel Cherry, Jonathan Cilley, Joseph Cilley, Amos Cogswell, Henry Dearborn, Amos Emerson, Jeremiah Fogg, Isaac Frye, Nicholas Gilman, Daniel Gookin, John Harvey, James Harvey McClary, Michael McClary, Neal McGaffey, Joshua Merrow, Joseph Mills, Josiah Munro, William Parker, Jr., Adna Penniman, Jonathan Perkins, Jeremiah Prichard, Benjamin Pierce, James Reed, William Rowell, Ebenezer Sullivan, John Sullivan, Robert Bradford Wilkins.

New Jersey 

James Anderson, Abraham Appleton, James Francis Armstrong, Daniel Baldwin, Jeremiah Ballard, William Barton, John Beatty, John Bishop, John Blair, Joseph Bloomfield, Absalom Bonham, James Bonnell, Seth Bowen, Nathaniel Bowman, David Brearley, Almarin Brooks, Jeremiah Bruen, Joseph Buck, William Burnet, Eden Burrowes, John Burrowes, Lambert Cadwalader, George Walker Campbell, Jabez Campfield, Samuel Conn, John Conway, Richard Cox, John Noble Cumming, Ephraim Darby, Elias Dayton, Jonathan Dayton, Cyrus De Hart, Nathaniel Donnell, Lewis Ford Dunham, Ebenezer Elmer, Eli Elmer, Peter Faulkner, Chilion Ford, Mahlon Ford, David Forman, Jonathan Forman, James Giles, Luther Halsey, Jacob Harris, James Heard, John Heard, William Helms, Dr. Thomas Henderson, Samuel Hendry, John Hollinshead, John Holmes, Jonathan Holmes, John Hopper, John Howell, Richard Howell, Andrew Hunter, Jacob Hyer, William Kersey, Abraham Kinney, John Kinney, Shepard Kollock, Derick Lane, Nathaniel Leonard, Richard Lloyd, Francis Luce, Absalom Martin, Giles Mead, Alexander Mitchell, Aaron Ogden, Matthias Ogden, Benajah Osmun, John Peck, Robert Pemberton, William Sanford Pennington, Jonathan Phillips, Jacob Piatt, William Piatt, John Polhemus, Samuel Reading, Anthony Reckless, John Reed, John Reed, John Reucastle, Jonathan Rhea, John Ross, Cornelius Riker Sedam, Samuel C. Seeley, Israel Shreve, Samuel Moore Shute, William Shute, Jonathan Snowden, Oliver Spencer, Moses Sprowl, Ebenezer Stockton, Abraham Stout, Wessel Ten Broeck Stout, Edmund Disney Thomas, William Tuttle, George Walker, Abel Weymen, Ephraim Lockhart Whitlock.

New York 

Aaron Burr, George Clinton, James Clinton, John Doughty, Nicholas Fish, Peter Gansevoort, Alexander Hamilton, Rufus King, Joseph Hardy, John Keese(major), John Lamb (general), Morgan Lewis, Henry Beekman Livingston, Henry Brockholst Livingston, Alexander McDougall, Charles McKnight, David Olyphant, Philip Schuyler, John Morin Scott, William Stephens Smith, John Stagg Jr, Ebenezer Stevens, Silas Talbot, Benjamin Tallmadge, Philip Van Cortlandt, Henry Vanderburgh, Cornelius Van Dyck, John Van Dyck, Richard Varick, William Scudder, Dr. Caleb Sweet, Maj.Gen. Friedrich Wilhelm von Steuben, Lt.Col., Bernardus Swartwout, Cornelius Swartwout, BG Philip Van Cortlandt, Friedrich Heinrich von Weissenfels.

Further list from Saffell:

Jonas Addoms, Peter Anspach, Aaron Aorson, Josiah Bagley, John Bard, Sebastian Bauman, Jerrick Beekman, William Belknap,Walter Bicker, Leonard Bleecker, James Bradford, James Brewster, David Brooks, Joseph Browne, Robert Burnett, Jonathan Burrall, Caleb Brewster, Aaron Burr, Duncan Campbell, John Cape, Nehemiah Carpenter, James Chrystie, Matthew Clarkson, James Clinton, George Clinton, Alexander Clinton, Christopher Codwise, Robert Cochran, Surgeon General John Cochran, William Colbreath, Michael Connolly, John Conway, Samuel Cooper, Andrew Cragie, John D. Crimshier, Ebenezer Crosby, Henry Cunningham, James Davidson, Henry Demler, Daniel Denniston, George J. Denniston, Pierre Regnier De Rousse, Simeon De Witt, Samuel Dodge, Samuel Dodge, John Doughty, Henry Dubois, Edward Dunscomb, Baron Charles D Aurier, John Elliott, Andrew English, James Fairlie, Ephraim Fenno, Nicholas Fish, George Fleming, John Fondy, Duoy Fondy, Joseph Foote, Theodocius Fowler, Joseph Frelick, John Furman, John Gano, David Gano, Peter Gansevoort, Benjamin Gilbert, James Giles, Aquilla Giles, John Graham, Charles Graham, Stephen Graham, Silas Gray, John W. Greaton, John Green, James Gregg, James Grier, John Grier, Isaac Guion, Hoysted Hacker, Mordecai Hale, Jonathan Hullctt, Luther Halsey, Alexander Hamilton, Abijah Hammond, John F. Hamtramck, Francis Hanmer, Abraham Hardensburg, Joseph Hardy, Samuel Hay, Nathaniel Henry, Benjamin Herring, Abel Holden, Bazaleel Howe, Isaac Hubbell, James Miles Hughes, Thomas Hunt, Christopher Button, Ephraim Hunt, Abraham Hyatt, Thomas T. Jackson, Cornelius T. Jansen, James Johnston, Robert Johnson, John Keese, Jacob Kemper, Daniel Hemper, John Lamb, Garret Lansing, John Lawrence, Nathaniel Lawrence, Jonathan Lawrence, George Leycraft, William Leycraft, Benjamin Ledyard, Isaac Ledyard, Morgan Lewis, Samuel Logan, Lebbcus Loomis, Henry E. Lutterloh, Abraham Leggett, Alexander McDougall, Renald S. Mc Dongall, Charles McKnight, Daniel McLane, Thomas Machin, Peter Magee, Samuel Mansfield, John Marsh, Elihu Marshall, Daniel Menema, Andrew Moodie, Joseph Morrell, William W. Morris, Ebenezer Macomber, Peter Nestell, Charles Newkirk, James Nicholson, Daniel Niven, William North, Nathaniel Norton, Daniel Parker, Charles Parsons, Henry Pawling, Samuel T. Pell, Robert Pemberton, Nathaniel Pendleton, William Peters, Richard Platt, William Popham, Henry Pray, William Price, Abner Prior, Thomas Randall, John Reed, Jacob Reed, John R. B. Rogers, Wilhelmus Ryckman, Baron De Steuben, John Sandford, Derick Schuyler, Philip Schuyler, William Scudder, John Shaw, Israel Smith, William S. Smith, Isaac Smith, Ephraim Snow, John Stagg, John Stake, Jehosaphat Starr, Gerard Stediford, Ebenezer Stevens, James Stewart, William Strachan, Caleb Swan, Bernardus Swartwout, Cornelius Swartwout, Caleb Sweet, George Sytez, William Stewart, Ebenezer Storer, Silas Talbott, Samuel Tallmadge, William Tapp, Peter Taulman, John C. Ten Broeck, Adam Ten Broeck, Alexander Thompson, Henry Tiebout, Thomas Tillotson, William Torrey, Robert Troup, John Trumbull, Thomas Turner, John F. Vacher, Philip Van Courtlandt, Cornelius Van Dyck, Henry Vandeburg, Bartholomew Vandeburg, John Van Dyck, Rudolph Van Hovenburgh, David Van Home, Jeremiah Van Rennselaer, Goosse Van Schaick, Garret Van Wagenen, Tunis Van Wagenan, Richard Varick, Veter Vosborough, Nicholas Van Rennselaer, John Waldron, Benjamin Walker, Jedediah Waterman, James Walson, Samuel B. Webb, Charles F. Weisenfels, Frederick Weisenfels, Jacob H. Wendell, John H. Wendell, Michael Wetzell, Andrew White, Anthony Walton White, Murinus Willett, Robert Wilson, Jacob Wright, Ephraim Woodruff, Peter Woodward

North Carolina 

William Lee Alexander, James Armstrong, John Armstrong, Thomas Armstrong, John Baptist Ashe, Samuel Ashe, Jr., Peter Bacot, Benjamin Bailey, Kedar Ballard, Robert Bell, Jacob Blount, Reading Blount, Adam Boyd, Joseph Blyth(e), Gee Bradley, Alexander Brevard, Joseph Brevard, William Bush, Thomas Callender, John Campbell, James Campen, Benjamin Carter, Thomas Clark, John Clendennen, Benjamin Coleman, John Craddock, Anthony Crutcher, John Daves, Samuel Denny, Charles Dixon, Tilghman Dixon, Wynn Dixon, George Doherty, Thomas Donoho, Thomas Evans, Richard Fenner, Robert Fenner, William Ferebee, Thomas Finney, John Ford (Foard), James Furgus (Fergus), Charles Gerrard (Garrard), Francis Graves, James West Green, Joshua Hadley, Clement Hall, Selby Harney, Robert Hays, John Hill, Thomas Hogg, Hardy Holmes, Robert Howe, John Ingles, Curtis Ivey, Abner Lamb, Nathaniel Lawrence, Nehemiah Long, Archibald Lytle, William Lytle, William Maclean (McLane), William McClure, James McDougall, John McNees, Griffith John McRee, Joseph Monfort, James Moore, Hardy Murfree, John Nelson, Thomas Pasture (Pasteur), William Polk, Robert Raiford, Jesse Read, John Read (Reed), Joseph Thomas Rhodes, William Sanders (Saunders), Anthony Sharp(e), Daniel Shaw, Stephen Slade, John Slaughter, Jesse Steed, John Summers, Jethro Sumner, James Tate, Howell Tatum, James Tatum, James Thackston, Nathaniel Williams, William Williams, and Edward Yarborough.

Pennsylvania 

Lt James McMichael, John Armstrong, Jr., Joshua Barney, John Barry, William Bingham, Thomas Boude, Daniel Brodhead, David Brooks, Edward Butler, Richard Butler, Thomas Butler, William Butler, Thomas Craig, Richard Dale, James Gilchrist, Edward Hand, Josiah Harmar, Thomas Hartley, Stewart Herbert, Richard Humpton, William Irvine, Francis Johnston, John Paul Jones, Mareen Lamar, Robert Magaw, Thomas Mifflin, John Peter Gabriel Muhlenberg, Alexander Murray, Lewis Nicola, Samuel Nicholas, Zebulon Pike, Thomas Proctor, Arthur St. Clair, William Thompson, Anthony Wayne, Baron von Steuben, Isaac Van Horne, Jacob Bower.Gustave Rosenthal

Further list from Saffell:

John Armstrong, Thos. Wylis, Francis White, James McLean, Sam. Doty, W. Ferguson, David Zeigler, F. Mentges, J. Pratt, Richd. Fullerton, Geo. Bush, John Strieker, Erkuries Beatty, Wm. Moore, Robt. McConnell, Jab. Weitzel, Wm. Wilson, James Armstrong, Jno. Bankson, J. McFarlane, Jno. Markland, Jno. Bush, Thos. Doyle, Jos. Harmar, R. Allison, Andrew. Lytle, T. Seely, John Doyle, Jas. F. McPherson, William Magaw, Anty. Wayne, William McHatton, C. De Marcellin, Le Koy, Le Chevalier De Lambert, H. Henly, Andrew Henderson, Joseph Ashton, Edward Speer, Robt. McMordie, John Stoy, Walter Stewart, Enos Reeves, James Morris Jones, Jno. McDowell, E. Edwards, P. Peres, Andrew Porter, Francis Nichols, Francis Proctor, William Murrin, Hen. D. Purcell, Andy. Walker, Stewart Herbert, J. Mackinney, Francis Johnston, Ja: Chrystie, Henry Bicker, Wilder Bevins, Benj. Lodge, Thomas Dungan, T. Robinson, Jas. Gamble, Henry Piercy, Alexander. Parker, Jas. Chambers, Matthew Maus, Fredrick. Vernon, J. Grier, John B. Webster, J. Moore, A. G. Claypoole, Daniel Brodhead, Matthew McConnell, James Glentworth, J. Stake, W. Van Lear, T. B. Bowen, W. Macpherson, David. S. Franks, Jesse Crosley, Jno. Strieker, Stephen Moylan, Zebn. Pike, John Davis, Isaac Craig, Stephen Bayard, W. Finney, S. Montgomery, John E. B. Rogers, Wm. McCurdy, Jno. Reily, Thos. Proctor, Chas. Turnbull, James Lloyd, James Hamilton, Ph. Liebery, Jean Aug. De Florat, Jno. Wigton, John Harper, John Christie, Benj. Bartholomew, Samaul. A. McCoffrey, John Jordan, Isaac Van Home, Js. Campbell, Jno. McClelan, J. McCullam, Beading Beatty, Wm. Sproat, Eichd. Butler, Isaac B. Dunn, W. McDowell, Edw. Crawford, John Eose, Wm. Martin, John Marshall, Jas. Parr, C. North,  Ln. Davis,  Francis Murray, Wm. Kogers, James R. Reid, John Patterson, John Van Court, Jno. Stotesbury, Jas. Pettigrew, Peter Smith, John Armstrong, Edmund Bourke, T. Boude, George Stevenson, Robt. Parker, Jas. McMichael, Levi Griffith, James Montgomery, Thomas Douglas, Barnabas Binney, Thos. Bond, Edward. Hand, T. Campbell, Wm. Lusk, George North, Andw. Irvine, John Nevill, John Boyd, Jacob Mytinger, Jno. Michon, Robt. Sample, Alex. Benstead, Wm. Henderson, Robert Wilkin, Adm. Hubley, Worsley Ernes, Nat. Irish, Thomas M. McCalla, Ezekiel Howell, Robt. Coltman, John Bryce, Matthew McGuire, Robert McGaw, James G. Heron, Wm. Sade, Wm. Wilkins, James Gilchrist, Thos. McIntire, Blackall Wm. Ball, John Humphrey, William Power, James Smith, L. Keene, A. St. Clair, Jer. Jackson, Job Vernon, Eobert Patton, Sam L Smith, Robt Martin, Philippe Avabing, John Craig, Ber d Kibley, James Davidson, J. Talbott, George Tudor, Sam l Bryson, Wm. Price, Jonah Hallett, Wm. Williams, Philip Shrawder, Samuel Talbott, Barthol ? Von Heer, Sam L Reed, Gabriel Peterson, Daniel St. Clair, John Weidman, William McMurray, Jeremiah Freeman, Hugh Martin, Joseph L, Jno. Nice, Will. Mackey, John Hughes, J. B. Tilden, Richard Hampton, J. Simonds, Jacob Bower,

Rhode Island 

Israel Angell, William Barton, Archibald Crary, Nathanael Greene, Moses Hazen, Daniel Jackson, William Jones, Daniel Lyman, Coggeshall Olney, Jeremiah Olney, Stephen Olney, Henry Sherburne, Silas Talbot, William Tew, Simeon Thayer, James Mitchell Varnum, Abraham Whipple, Joseph Arnold.

Virginia 

Charter members from Virginia include:
Richard Clough Anderson Sr., George Baylor, Francis T. Brooke, Abraham Buford, Nicholas Cabell, William Overton Callis, Edward Carrington, Louis de Corny, John Cropper, William Davies, Christian Febiger, Horatio Gates, John Gibson, William Grayson, John Green, Charles Harrison, William Heth, Peter Higgins, Samuel Hopkins, Henry Lee III, John Crittenden, Sr., Charles Lewis, George Mathews, James Monroe, Daniel Morgan, John Muhlenberg, John Neville, Thomas Overton, Major Charles Pelham, Thomas Posey, Major John Pryor, Robert Rankin, William Russell, Charles Scott,Alexander Skinner, John Stith, Richard Taylor, John Ward, John Watts, George Washington, George Augustine Washington, George Weedon, David Williams, Willis Wilson, James Wood, Henry Young.

South Carolina 

Isaac Huger, James Kennedy, Charles Lining, William Moultrie, Thomas Pinckney, Nathaniel Abney

Other countries

France 
Jean Baptiste de Traversay, Maxime Julien Émeriau de Beauverger, Pierre L'Enfant, Louis-René Levassor de Latouche Tréville, Paul François Ignace de Barlatier de Mas, Gilbert du Motier, Louis Marc Antoine de Noailles, Georges René Le Peley de Pléville, Charles Armand Tuffin, Jean Gaspard Vence, Alexandre-Théodore-Victor, Jean-Baptiste Donatien de Vimeur, Joseph de Cambis, Claude-Anne de Rouvroy de Saint Simon, Maurice Jean Marie Boudin de Launay de Tromelin, Pierre de Roquefeuil.

Polish–Lithuanian Commonwealth 

Tadeusz Kościuszko

Sweden 

Count Axel von Fersen, Baron Curt von Stedingk. (Members of the French Society.)

References 

1783 establishments in New York (state)
501(c)(3) organizations
American Revolution veterans and lineage organizations
Libraries in Washington, D.C.
Non-profit organizations based in Washington, D.C.
Organizations established in 1783
Patriotic societies